Les Angles-sur-Corrèze is a commune in the Corrèze department in the Nouvelle-Aquitaine region of central France.

Geography
Les Angles-sur-Corrèze is located some 7 km north-west of Tulle and 30 km south-west of Égletons. It is traversed by the A89 autoroute from west to east through the heart of the commune but there is no exit in the commune. The nearest exits are Exit 20 to the west of the commune and Exit 21 to the east. Access to the commune is by road D58 which branches off the D23 south of the commune and continues north to the village and continues north then east to join the D1089 highway which forms the south-eastern border of the commune. There are large areas of forest in the commune with some areas of farmland near the village. Apart from the village there is the hamlet of Le Massoulier towards the east.

The Corrèze river forms the northern and western borders of the commune as it flows south to join the Vézère west of Brive-la-Gaillarde. Many unnamed streams rise in the commune and flow into the Correze.

Neighbouring communes and villages

Toponymy
The locality appears in charters dated 1404 in the form Anguli. Its name is a reference to the shape of the village of a pointed wedge (like the head of a wood-chopping axe).

History

Heraldry

Administration

List of Successive Mayors

Demography
In 2017 the commune had 112 inhabitants.

Culture and heritage

Religious heritage
The Parish Church of the Nativity of Notre-Dame contains two items that are registered as historical objects:
A Statue: Saint Apôtre (17th century)
A Statue: Saint Roch (17th century)

Environmental heritage

The village square (with a well for animals) has a grouping of buildings of a Church, Town Hall, and School, all in stone. It is a few kilometres on foot from the village to the Corrèze river and to the left a path leads to the Gimel-les-Cascades waterfalls. Again in the village square in front of the well a small path leads over the hills towards the A89 autoroute with beautiful landscapes.

See also
Communes of the Corrèze department

References

External links

Les Angles-sur-Corrèze on the National Geographic Institute website 
Les Angles-sur-Corrèze on Géoportail, National Geographic Institute (IGN) website 
les Angles on the 1750 Cassini Map

Communes of Corrèze